Onur Alp Kayador (born 5 June 1955) is a Turkish retired professional footballer who is most associated with the Turkish club Fenerbahçe. He also represented the Turkey national team. He played as a defender during his playing career.

Honours
Fenerbahçe
Süper Lig (4): 1973–74, 1974–75, 1982–83, 1984–85
Turkish Cup (2): 1978–79, 1982–83
Turkish Super Cup (2): 1983–84, 1984–85
Prime Minister's Cup (1): 1979–80
Fleet Cup (3): 1982–83, 1983–84, 1984–85
TSYD Cup (4): 1975–76, 1980–81, 1982–83, 1986–87

External links
 
 NFT Profile
 Mackolik Profile

1955 births
Living people
Footballers from Istanbul
Turkish footballers
Turkey international footballers
Fenerbahçe S.K. footballers
Adana Demirspor footballers
Association football defenders
Süper Lig players